The 2016 Northeast Conference men's soccer season was the 36th season of men's varsity soccer in the conference.

The LIU Brooklyn Blackbirds are the defending regular season and tournament champions.

St. Francis Brooklyn won the Regular Season Championship by going 6-0-1 in conference play and won the Tournament Championship by defeating Sacred Heart and Saint Francis (PA). St. Francis Brooklyn will play against Dartmouth in the NCAA tournament.

Changes from 2015 

 None

Teams 

Notes:

All records, appearances, titles, etc. are from time with current school only.
Year at school includes 2016 season.
Overall and NEC records are from time at current school and are before the beginning of the season.

Preseason

Rankings

() first place votes

Regular season

Player of the week
Throughout the regular season, the Northeast Conference offices named a player of the week and a freshman of the week each Monday.

Rankings

NSCAA national

NSCAA northeast region

Results

All-NEC awards and teams

Postseason

NEC tournament

 
 
The 2016 Northeast Conference men's soccer tournament was held at Pier 5 in Brooklyn Bridge Park in Brooklyn, NY, the home of St. Francis Brooklyn. The semifinals took place on November 11 and the championship on November 13.

NCAA tournament

See also 
 2016 NCAA Division I men's soccer season

References 

 
2016 NCAA Division I men's soccer season